Little Gull Island is an island in Fairbanks Township, Delta County, Michigan. The island is located at the mouth of the bay of Green Bay in Lake Michigan. It is part of a chain of islands that are outcroppings of the Niagara Escarpment. The Michigan Nature Association owns the entirety of the island.

References

Islands of Delta County, Michigan
Uninhabited islands of Michigan
Islands of Lake Michigan in Michigan